Feng Shu is a Chinese artist from Beijing who produces detailed skull and insect sculptures made from intricate hand-painted ceramic and steel.

Life and work 

Shu was born in Beijing, China in 1981. He studied sculpture at the prestigious Central Academy of Fine Arts for both his Bachelor of Fine Arts (2005) and Masters of Fine Arts (2009).

An artist in the 1980s generation of Chinese artists, his detailed painted ceramic and steel skulls and insects have been released in the “Beautiful Bugs Series.” In an interview, Shu stated his inspiration comes from growing up as an only child because of the one-child policy in China, "so it was a little lonely and boring. As a child, I was always outside looking for insects to play with."

His works have been shown worldwide at F2 Gallery (Fabien Fryns Fine Art), The Opposite House Beijing, and CIGE. They have been sold at international auctions and are in major collections.

In 2010 Feng Shu completed an installation at the Tai Wai MTR Station in Hong Kong. His work was shown at Art14 in London in 2014.

He lives and works in Beijing.

See also 
 Central Academy of Fine Arts
 Fabien Fryns Fine Art

References

External links
 Feng Shu's artwork on Fabien Fryns Fine Art

Chinese sculptors
1981 births
Artists from Beijing
Central Academy of Fine Arts alumni
Living people
21st-century Chinese sculptors